Pick a Star is a 1937 American musical comedy film starring Rosina Lawrence, Jack Haley, Patsy Kelly and Mischa Auer, directed by Edward Sedgwick, produced by Hal Roach and released through Metro-Goldwyn-Mayer, and filmed by Norbert Brodine. A reworking of Buster Keaton's first talkie, Free and Easy, the film is mostly remembered today for two short scenes featuring Laurel and Hardy.

The film was reissued as Movie Struck by Astor Pictures in 1954.

Plot 
Cecelia (Rosina Lawrence) enters a talent show in Waterloo, Kansas with the promise that the winner will be given a part in a movie. Lawrence wins but never receives her prize because the organizer (Russell Hicks) has run off with the cash.

The emcee, Joe Jenkins (Jack Haley), feels partly responsible for her disappointment and promises Lawrence that he will go to Hollywood to launch her career as a movie star. He sells his garage and moves to Hollywood, but is only able to find a job bussing tables at a local nightclub. He writes to Lawrence, however, that he has become a successful entertainer.

Lawrence has in the meantime crossed paths with Latin lover movie idol Rinaldo Lopez (Mischa Auer), who arrives in Waterloo when his plane makes an emergency landing there. Two of the other passengers give their plane tickets to Lawrence and her sister Nellie (Patsy Kelly), who then accompany Auer to Hollywood.

When she surprises Haley by showing up at the nightclub where he works Haley pretends that he is part of the floor show rather than just a busboy. Lawrence sees through the ruse and leaves with Auer. Haley follows Lawrence as she leaves, and is hit by a studio mogul Mr. Klawheimer (Charles Halton), who gives Haley a job as a studio driver in order to avoid a lawsuit.

Meanwhile Auer takes the girls to the studio to watch musical star Dagmar (Lyda Roberti) shoot an elaborate scene modeled after the extravagant numbers shot by Busby Berkeley. Kelly wanders onto the set where Laurel and Hardy are filming a scene in a Mexican barroom, directed by (James Finlayson). After watching them film a brawl, she asks the team whether they're afraid of hurting themselves. Hardy explains that the bottles they hit each other with are lightweight phonies and offer their heads in demonstration. Kelly grabs an actual liquor bottle by mistake and knocks the team out cold.

While Kelly is distracted Auer invites Lawrence to his apartment. They are driven there by Haley, who sees what Auer has in mind, and drives back to the studio to get Kelly after dropping Lawrence and Auer off. While Haley and Kelly return, Lawrence is crying, prompting Kelly to knock Auer out cold. Haley stays to revive Auer when Lawrence and Kelly leave, and Auer promises that he will try to get Lawrence a job in the movies.

Later Laurel and Hardy engage in a musical competition involving a trumpet and a tiny harmonica. When Hardy accidentally swallows the harmonica Laurel shows how to continue to play it by pressing the right spots on Hardy's belly.

Roberti storms off the set in a fit of pique. A fed-up studio shoehorns Lawrence in her place and she makes good after Haley helps her overcome her stage fright during her screen test.

Cast 
 Patsy Kelly as Nellie Moore
 Jack Haley as Joe Jenkins
 Rosina Lawrence as Cecilia Moore
 Mischa Auer as Rinaldo Lopez
 Lyda Roberti as Dagmar
 Charles Halton as Mr. Klawheimer
 Tom Dugan as Dimitri Hogan
 Russell Hicks as Mr. Stone
 Cully Richards as Night club M.C.
 Spencer Charters as Judge
 Sam Adams as Sheriff
 Robert Gleckler as Head waiter
 Joyce Compton and Johnny Arthur as Newlyweds
 James Finlayson as Director
 Walter Long as Bandit--(last appearance with Laurel&Hardy)
 Wesley Barry as Assistant director
 Johnny Hyams as Mr. McGregor
 Leila McIntyre as Mrs. McGregor
 Stan Laurel and Oliver Hardy as Movie stars
 Felix Knight as Nightclub Singer (uncredited)

See also 
 Laurel and Hardy films
 Laurel and Hardy
 Stan Laurel
 Oliver Hardy
 James Finlayson

References

External links 

 
 
 
 
 {Pick a Star review at Famous Clowns}

1937 films
American musical comedy films
1930s English-language films
Films directed by Edward Sedgwick
Metro-Goldwyn-Mayer films
American black-and-white films
1937 musical comedy films
1930s American films